Bathymophila valentia is a species of sea snail, a marine gastropod mollusk in the family Solariellidae.

Description
The diameter of the shell attains 8.6 mm.

Distribution
This marine species is endemic to New Zealand and occurs off the Three Kings Rise at depths between 1210 m and 1570 m.

References

 Marshall, B.A. 1999: A revision of the Recent Solariellinae (Gastropoda: Trochoidea) of the New Zealand region. The Nautilus 113: 4-42

External links

valentia
Gastropods described in 1999